Lydia Musonda Kasangala (born 6 May 1988) is a Congolese handball player for Mikishi Lubumbashi and the DR Congo national team.

She represented DR Congo at the 2013 World Women's Handball Championship in Serbia, where DR Congo placed 20th.

References

1988 births
Living people
African Games medalists in handball
African Games bronze medalists for DR Congo
Democratic Republic of the Congo female handball players
Competitors at the 2019 African Games
21st-century Democratic Republic of the Congo people